The Latvian Women's League (Latvian: Sieviešu futbola līga) is the top level women's football league of Latvia.

The winning team of the league qualifies for a spot in the UEFA Women's Champions League. As participation is optional, no Latvian team competed in the competition until 2011/12 when SK Liepājas Metalurgs entered European territory.

2022 teams
Auda
Iecava (new)
Metta
AFA Olaine
Rigas FS
SFK Rīga (new)
Super Nova

List of champions 
Champions so far are: 
 1992: Fortūna-Rego
-2003?:
2004: Cerība-46.vsk.
2005: Saldus FK - Lutriņi
2006: Cerība-46.vsk.
2007: FK Lutriņi
2008: Skonto / Cerība
2009: Skonto / Cerība
2010: SK Liepājas Metalurgs
2011: Skonto / Cerība
2012: SK Liepājas Metalurgs
2013: Rīgas FS
2014: Rīgas FS
2015: Rīgas FS
2016: Rīgas FS
2017: Rīgas FS
2018: Rīgas FS
2019: Dinamo Riga
2020: Rīgas FS
2021: Rīgas FS

References

External links 
 Official Website of the Latvian Football Federation
 League at uefa.com

 
Top level women's association football leagues in Europe
Women's football competitions in Latvia
Summer association football leagues
Women